Some may refer to:
some, an English word used as a determiner and pronoun; see use of some
The term associated with the existential quantifier
"Some", a song by Built to Spill from their 1994 album There's Nothing Wrong with Love
Socialist-oriented market economy, the Vietnamese economic system occasionally abbreviated SOME
Social market economy, the German socioeconomic model abbreviated SOME
So Others Might Eat (SOME), a Washington, D.C.-based non-profit organization
SoMe, short for social media
Some (film), a 24 film
"Some" (song), a duet by Junggigo and Soyou
Some & Any, German pop duo